"Wicked Game" is a song by American rock musician Chris Isaak, released from his third album, Heart Shaped World (1989). Despite being released as a single in July 1989, it did not become a hit until it was featured in the 1990 David Lynch film Wild at Heart, starring Nicolas Cage and Laura Dern. Lee Chesnut, an Atlanta radio station music director who loved David Lynch films, began playing the song, and it quickly became an American top-10 hit in January 1991, reaching number six on the Billboard Hot 100, making it the first hit song of Isaak's career. The single also became a number-one hit in Belgium and reached the top 10 in several other nations.

"Wicked Game" has been covered by many other artists and been featured in numerous movies and television series and advertisements, so much so that Dazed magazine questioned whether it might be the most influential love song in modern music. It has subsequently received retrospective critical acclaim, being listed in the 2010 book 1001 Songs You Must Hear Before You Die, and noted by Dave Marsh in an updated edition of his 1989 book The Heart of Rock & Soul: The 1001 Greatest Singles Ever Made.

Composition
The song is in the key of B Dorian mode performed in what AllMusic describes as a "brooding, sorrowfully conflicted" tone.

Although it is often interpreted as a ballad about unrequited love, Isaak has said that the song was inspired by a telephone call from a woman seeking to arrange a casual sexual liaison and is about "what happens when you have a strong attraction to people that aren't necessarily good for you". It was written shortly after the call.

During the sessions for Isaak's third album, many different versions and arrangements of the song were made before the final version was completed. James Calvin Wilsey came up with the distinctive guitar lead; both the bassline and drums (except the cymbals) were sampled from previous recordings of the song and then looped.

Critical reception
Scottish newspaper Aberdeen Evening Express extolled "[the] haunting strains" of "Wicked Game." Grant Walters from Albumism praised the song as a "pristine union of Isaak's aching vocal and the desolate wail of James Calvin Wilsey's '65 Stratocaster." He added, "Underneath, the brushed drum loop, simple bass line, and muted background vocals create a simmering atmospheric buzz." Steve Huey from AllMusic described it as a "shimmering," "spare," and "moody masterpiece." Larry Flick from Billboard called it "[a] delicious treat." Alaister Moughan from Dazed wrote, "Some songs are masterpieces, some represent moments in time, and others are simply good jams. Chris Isaak's "Wicked Game" is all three." Joe Rhodes from Entertainment Weekly stated that this is "perhaps the album's darkest mood piece," noting its "otherworldly" opening guitar line. Pan-European magazine Music & Media described it as "[a] laid-back C&W tinged song featuring Isaak's Orbison-esque vocals." Duncan Holland from Music Week felt that its "dexterity and panache is something rarely heard. The touches of Roy Orbison only make it stronger and given the right airplay, Isaak should score a significant, if unpredictable hit." A reviewer from Sunday Life complimented it as "[a] brooding ballad, image-laden, and worthy of Roy Orbison in his heyday."

Music videos
There are two different music videos for this song. The more well-known video was directed by Herb Ritts, shot in Hawaii at what was formerly known as Kamoamoa beach in Hawaii Volcanoes National Park on the Big Island. The newly formed black-sand beach was created from lava from Kilauea volcano flowing into the ocean about a mile away. The beach was covered by lava not long after the video was shot. The video features supermodel Helena Christensen rolling and frolicking on the beach with Isaak. It was mostly filmed in black and white. Christensen is topless through most of the video, although her nudity is concealed by camera angles. In the middle of the video, Christensen is seen only in her black lace bra and panty; other times, she wears only a men's white brief. The video achieved heavy rotation on MTV and MTV Europe, winning the MTV Video Music Awards for Best Male Video and Best Cinematography. It was ranked number 13 on VH1's "100 Greatest Videos", number four on VH1's "50 Sexiest Video Moments", number 73 on Rolling Stone magazine's "The 100 Top Music Videos", number one on Rolling Stone magazine's "The 30 Sexiest Music Videos of All Time", and number one on Fuse's "40 Sexiest Videos" in 2010.

Another video was commissioned for the Wild at Heart VHS release and was directed by David Lynch.
It features scenes of Lula (Laura Dern) and Sailor (Nicolas Cage) from the film, interspersed with black-and-white footage of Isaak and his band performing the song. This video won the MTV Video Music Award for Best Video from a Film.

Track listings

 US 7-inch and cassette single
A. "Wicked Game" (edit) – 4:06
B. "Wicked Game" (instrumental) – 4:48

 European 7-inch single (1989)
A. "Wicked Game" – 4:46
B. "Don't Make Me Dream About You" – 3:30

 UK 7-inch and cassette single
A. "Wicked Game"
B. "Cool Cat Walk" (by Angelo Badalamenti)

 UK 12-inch and CD single
 "Wicked Game"
 "Cool Cat Walk" (by Badalamenti)
 "Dark Spanish Symphony" (by Badalamenti; string version)

 French CD single
 "Wicked Game" – 4:46
 "Don't Make Me Dream About You" – 3:30
 "Wicked Game" (instrumental) – 4:48

 French cassette single
 "Wicked Game" (edit) – 4:46
 "Don't Make Me Dream About You" – 3:30

Personnel
 Chris Isaak – vocals, acoustic guitar
 James Calvin Wilsey –  electric guitar
 Rowland Salley – bass guitar, vocals
 Kenney Dale Johnson – percussion
 Frank Martin – keyboards

Charts

Weekly charts

Year-end charts

Certifications

Release history

Other versions

Covers (studio releases)

HIM

The Finnish band HIM remade this song, first using it in their demo This Is Only the Beginning, then on their EP 666 Ways To Love: Prologue, followed by another recording of it on their first album Greatest Lovesongs Vol. 666, and again on the British and American versions of their second album Razorblade Romance. The last recording they made of it then reappeared on their compilation album And Love Said No: The Greatest Hits 1997–2004. "Wicked Game" became the band's breakthrough song in their native Finland. Their version appeared on an episode of Smallville.

Track listings

 German release
 "Wicked Game" – 3:54
 "For You" – 4:00
 "Our Diabolical Rapture" – 5:20
 "Wicked Game" (666 Remix) – 3:58

 Finnish release
 "Wicked Game"
 "For You"

 2000 UK release
 "Wicked Game" – 3:36
 "When Love and Death Embrace" (Amnt Mix) – 3:34
 "The Heartless" (Serdlidlim Mix) – 3:11

 2000 Swedish release
 "Wicked Game" 2000
 "When Love and Death Embrace" (Amnt Mix) – 3:34

Parra for Cuva

In 2013, German house producer Parra for Cuva released a cover version that featured Anna Naklab. The single was re-titled as "Wicked Games" in plural. It was first released on Beatport worldwide as a digital download in August 2013, then a mainstream release as a digital download in France in October 2013 and in Germany on February 14, 2014. The song has charted in Australia, France, Belgium, the United Kingdom and the Netherlands.

Track listing
"Wicked Games" (radio edit) – 3:15
"Wicked Games" (original mix) – 5:58

Charts

Weekly charts

Year-end charts

Certifications

Others

References

1989 songs
1990 singles
American folk rock songs
Chris Isaak songs
HIM (Finnish band) songs
Il Divo songs
MTV Video Music Award for Best Male Video
Music videos directed by Herb Ritts
Music videos directed by David Lynch
Black-and-white music videos
Song recordings produced by Erik Jacobsen
Bertelsmann Music Group singles
Reprise Records singles
Syco Music singles
Spinnin' Records singles
Songs written by Chris Isaak
Country ballads
Folk ballads
Rock ballads
1980s ballads
Songs about casual sex
1998 singles